Of Pups and Puzzles is a 1941 American short documentary film directed by George Sidney. It won an Oscar at the 14th Academy Awards, held in 1942, for Best Short Subject (One-Reel).

Cast 
 John Nesbitt as Narrator (voice)
 Eddy Chandler as Foreman (uncredited)
 Mark Daniels as First Job Applicant (uncredited)
 William Forrest as Psychiatrist (uncredited)

References

External links 

1941 films
1941 documentary films
Live Action Short Film Academy Award winners
American black-and-white films
Metro-Goldwyn-Mayer short films
Films directed by George Sidney
American short documentary films
Black-and-white documentary films
1941 short films
1940s short documentary films
1940s American films